Parahypopta radoti is a species of moth of the family Cossidae. It is found in France.

The wingspan is 32–38 mm. The forewings are whitish brown, with a row of small roundish brown spots at the costal margin. The hindwings are brown without a pattern.

References

Moths described in 1911
Cossinae
Moths of Europe